Yevlakh is a city in Azerbaijan, 265 km west of capital Baku. It is surrounded by, but administratively separate from, the Yevlakh District.

Etymology 
The settlement is mentioned by the 13th century Armenian historian Stephen Orbelian in the form of Evaylakh. The name "Yevlakh" is derived from Old Turkic and means "wetland" according to 20th century Soviet geographer Evgeny Pospelov.

History 
The city of Yevlakh was initially established as a station in the 1880s and known as the "Vagzal" for a long time by the local population. In the official documents and sources of the 19th century and early 20th century the city is referred to as Yevlakh station of Yelizavetpol province, then Yevlakh village of Yelizavetpol province, and in 1920, it took the name of Yevlakh village located in the Javanshir region. The Yevlakh region first was organized on February 20, 1935, by the decision of Azerbaijan SSR, on February 1, 1939, by the decision of the Supreme Soviet of the Azerbaijani Soviet Socialist Republic, Yevlakh was referred to as a city. The Yevlakh region was abolished by the decision of the X session of the Supreme Soviet of the Azerbaijan Soviet Socialist Republic on December 26, 1962, and its territory was transferred to Agdash, Barda and Gasim Ismayilov districts, and it became the industrial city in Azerbaijan SSR. In 1965, Yevlakh again turned into an independent region. By the decree of the Presidium of the Supreme Soviet of the Azerbaijani SSR on January 6, 1965, Yevlakh was included in the list of cities in Azerbaijan SSR and started the construction of industrial enterprises in the city. Nowadays, the city has 4200 meters long Heydar Aliyev, Nizami avenues, 5500 meters long and 168 streets. The monument dedicated to Azerbaijan's national leader Heydar Aliyev that locates in the biggest square within the city- Heydar Aliyev Square, Heydar Aliyev Alley, Dede Gorgud, Samad Vurgun, Nizami, Friendship, Independence parks have been established lately.

Geography 

Yevlakh is located in Aran Economic Region. The climate that common for this region is dry subtropical.

Climate 
Yevlakh has a semi-arid climate (Köppen climate classification: BSk).

Demographics 

As of 2016, the population increased in the city in comparison with the previous years by about 7.1 thousand people. According to the population census data in 2009, urban population accounted for 55.04% and rural was 44.96%.

Number of population

Economy 

There are agricultural processing enterprises, manufacturing and industrial complexes within Yevlakh city.

Yevlakh city is also rich with natural resources like clay mixture sand deposits, as well as clay, sand and gravel deposits needed for brick making.

Culture 
 In the city of Yavlakh, there are 45 libraries that serve the population of the district. Ten of them are located in the city center and 35 in the villages. There are 552300 copies of books in the book fund of the libraries. Currently, there are 18 culture houses (2 in the city, 16 in the villages), 22 clubs and 6 music schools in the city. Yevlakh History and Ethnography Museum (2005) and Heydar Aliyev Museum (2006) are two main museums in Yevlakh.

Music and media
The regional channel El TV is headquartered in the city.

Transport

Air 
Yevlax Airport is the only airport in the city. The airport is connected by bus to the city center. There are domestic flights to Baku.

Rail 

Yevlakh sits on one of the Azerbaijani primary rail lines running east–west connecting the capital, Baku, with the rest of the country. The Kars–Tbilisi–Baku railway will run along the line through the city. The railway provides both human transportation and transport of goods and commodities such as oil and gravel.

Yevlakh's Central Railway Station is the terminus for national and international rail links to the city. The Kars–Tbilisi–Baku railway, which will directly connect Turkey, Georgia and Azerbaijan, began to be constructed in 2007 and is scheduled for completion in 2015. The completed branch will connect Yevlakh with Tbilisi in Georgia, and from there, trains will continue to Akhalkalaki, and Kars in Turkey.

Notable natives 

The city's notable residents include: Orthodox theologian Pavel Florensky, human rights activist Anar Mammadli and government civilian Elmar Valiyev.

References

External links 
 
 World Gazetteer: Azerbaijan – World-Gazetteer.com

 
Populated places in Yevlakh District